The  is a skyscraper located in Aomori, Aomori Prefecture, Japan. Construction of the 76-meter, 15-story skyscraper was finished in 1986.

External links
  

Buildings and structures completed in 1986
Aomori (city)
Skyscrapers in Japan
Tourist attractions in Aomori Prefecture
Buildings and structures in Aomori Prefecture
Pyramids in Japan
Shimizu Corporation
1986 establishments in Japan